Beacher is a surname. Notable people with the surname include:

 James Beacher (born 1987), English footballer
 Jeff Beacher (born 1973), American entertainment producer

See also
 Beecher (surname)